Chhatarpur  Assembly constituency is an assembly constituency in the Indian state of Jharkhand.

Members of Legislative Assembly

See also
Palamu Loksabha constituency
Patan block
Vidhan Sabha
Jharkhand
Palamu
Jharkhand Legislative Assembly
List of states of India by type of legislature

References

Assembly constituencies of Jharkhand